NGC 1868 is a globular cluster in the Large Magellanic Cloud in the constellation Dorado. It was discovered by John Herschel in 1834.

References

External links 

SIMBAD
NASA/IPAC
Flower, P. J., Geisler, D., Olszewski, E. W., & Hodge, P.: NGC 1868 - A metal-poor intermediate-age cluster in the Large Magellanic Cloud, 1980ApJ...235..769F

1868
Dorado (constellation)
Globular clusters
Large Magellanic Cloud